Fuze are an English pop rock band who formed in 2010. The band consists of Ed Alston (lead vocals and guitar), George Kirchner (lead guitar and vocals), Jack Goldsmith (bass guitar and backing vocals) and Keir Adamson (drums and backing vocals). They were signed by LUMI Records in 2011 prior to the release of their debut album, That's What She Said. The band's name originates from the American drink, Fuze. Their debut single, Hey You, was used in the soundtrack for the UK film, The Shouting Men, which featured Craig Fairbrass, Warren Llambias, John Barnes and Matt Daniel-Baker. Their second single, When You Come Home, was released in July 2011. Fuze were crowned Chelmsford's YFest winners in August 2011 after return from their tour of England. The band are believed to have finished writing for their second album, which is due for release in 2012.

History

2008-2010: Early years

Prior to Fuze, in 2008 George Kirchner invited Jack Goldsmith, who lived just four doors away, to join his band Blue Faze Fuze. After a load of gigs and three different drummers, in 2009 Jack Goldsmith was introduced by his brother-in-law to Keir Adamson who just by chance happened to attend Trinity Catholic High School, the same school that George had attended. George auditioned Keir during the school lunch hour and it was not only Keir's drumming ability that impressed George, but also his sense of humour and like-ability. Keir officially joined Fuze in November 2009 and was thrown straight into the deep end by playing fifteen gigs in the space of two months. In January 2010, Fuze started auditioning for a new front man however, nobody really caught their eye. It was later that year in April, when George Kirchner came across an acoustic cover of Supermassive black hole on YouTube by Ed Alston. George emailed Ed and invited him to come along to their next gig, however due to Ed living in Chelmsford, he found traveling to London a problem. It wasn't until May, when Fuze played at The Box in Chelmsford, when Ed eventually came to a gig. After liking what he saw, Ed joined the band a week later.

The band released their first EP, named "It's An EP Fool!", in June 2010. The EP was recorded live in studio 7K, and included songs, "Lies", "Don't Cry", "Waste My Time" and "Changed Ways". The EP was played by many local radio stations and led to new gigs at venues the band had not played before. Fuze also posted a couple of video blogs on YouTube to gain popularity and more hits on their MySpace page.

English pop music groups
Musical groups established in 2010
2010 establishments in England